Gruff may refer to:

Gruff, harsh and surly in nature and/or tone of voice
Gruffs, servants of the Summer Faerie Court in Jim Butcher's The Dresden Files series
The Three Billy Goats Gruff, Norwegian folk-tale The Three Billy Goats Gruff
Gruff, a character in Legend of the NeverBeast from Disney
Gruff, a diminutive of Welsh name Gruffudd